Ian Gibson (born 21 April 1939) is an Irish author and Hispanist known for his biographies of the poet Antonio Machado, the artist Salvador Dalí, the bibliographer Henry Spencer Ashbee, the filmmaker Luis Buñuel. and particularly his work on the poet and playwright Federico García Lorca, for which he won several awards, including the 1989 James Tait Black Memorial Prize for biography. His work, La represión nacionalista de Granada en 1936 y la muerte de Federico García Lorca (The Nationalist Repression of Granada in 1936 and the Death of Federico García Lorca) was banned in Spain under Franco.

Born in Dublin to a Methodist family, he was educated at Newtown School in Waterford and graduated from Trinity College, Dublin. He taught modern Spanish literature at Queen's University Belfast and the University of London before moving to Spain. His first novel, Viento del Sur (Wind of the South, 2001), written in Spanish, examines class, religion, family life, and public schools in British society through the fictitious autobiography of a character named John Hill, an English linguist and academic. It won favourable reviews in Spain.

Gibson has also worked in television on projects centering on his scholarly work in Spanish history, having served as a historical consultant and even acting in one historical drama.

He was granted a Spanish passport (citizenship) 1984. 

Gibson narrated a two-part documentary for BBC2 on the Great Famine of Ireland in 1995.

Works 
 La represión nacionalista de Granada en 1936 y la muerte de Federico García Lorca (1971)
 En busca de José Antonio (1981)
 Un irlandés en España (1982)
 La noche que mataron a Calvo Sotelo (1982)
 Paracuellos, cómo fue (1983)
 Guía de la Granada de Federico García Lorca (1989)
 España (1993)
 Vida, pasión y muerte de Federico García Lorca (1998)
 La vida desaforada de Salvador Dalí (1998)
 Lorca-Dalí, el amor que no pudo ser (1999)
 Viento del sur (2001)
 Yo, Ruben Darío (2002)
 Cela, el hombre que quiso ganar (2004)
 Ligero de equipaje (2006)
 Cuatro poetas en guerra (2007)
 Lorca y el mundo gay (2009)
 La berlina de Prim (2012), Fernando Lara Novel Award, 2012
 Luis Buñuel. La forja de un cineasta universal (1900-1938) (2013)
Aventuras ibéricas (2017)
Los últimos caminos de Antonio Machado (2019)

References

 Short biography
 Guardian article on Viento del Sur

External links
 

1939 births
Living people
Irish biographers
Irish male non-fiction writers
Irish male writers
Irish emigrants to Spain
Spanish people of Irish descent
Irish writers
Spanish male writers
Spanish biographers
Male biographers
Irish Hispanists
James Tait Black Memorial Prize recipients
Historians of fascism
People educated at Newtown School, Waterford
Alumni of Trinity College Dublin